In algebraic geometry, the cohomology of a stack is a generalization of étale cohomology. In a sense, it is a theory that is coarser than the Chow group of a stack.

The cohomology of a quotient stack (e.g., classifying stack) can be thought of as an algebraic counterpart of equivariant cohomology. For example, Borel's theorem states that the cohomology ring of a classifying stack is a polynomial ring.

See also 
l-adic sheaf
smooth topology

References 
 

Algebraic geometry
Cohomology theories